Marcus Christian Allbäck (born 5 July 1973) is a Swedish former professional footballer who played as a striker. He was known for his sharp finishing ability and represented clubs in Sweden, Denmark, Italy, the Netherlands, England, and Germany during a career that spanned between 1992 and 2009. A full international between 1999 and 2008, he won 74 caps for the Sweden national team and scored 30 goals. He represented Sweden at three UEFA European Championships (2000, 2004, and 2008) as well as two FIFA World Cups (2002 and 2006).

After his playing career he served as an assistant coach for the Sweden national team between 2009 and 2016.

Club career

Early career 
Born in Gothenburg, Allbäck started his professional career with Örgryte IS. He then proceeded to have two modest loan stints abroad, with Lyngby Boldklub and A.S. Bari of Serie A, before rejoining his first club.

In 2000, he joined SC Heerenveen of the Eredivisie, before moving to Aston Villa for £2 million in 2002. He was not a regular for the Premier League club, due to Darius Vassell and Juan Pablo Ángel. At the end of his contract, he joined Hansa Rostock in summer 2004.

F.C. Copenhagen 
In the summer of 2005, aged 32, Allbäck signed with F.C. Copenhagen. On 1 November 2006, he scored their first goal ever in the UEFA Champions League – a winner against two-times competition winners Manchester United. In that match, he was also awarded the fans' Man of the Match award. 20 days later he also scored against S.L. Benfica at Estádio da Luz – a match lost 3–1. Allbäck scored again in the last group stage match against Celtic at Parken in a 3–1 win. After the final home game of the Danish Superliga 2006–07 season, he was presented with the fans' Player of the Year award, as the side emerged back-to-back champions, and the striker netted 11 league goals.

In August 2007, Allbäck scored a late away equaliser against Beitar Jerusalem in the second leg of the second round Champions League qualifier in extra time, to keep Copenhagen's group stage dreams alive, although the side would eventually bow out to Benfica in the next round.

Return to Sweden and retirement 
On 1 July 2008, Allbäck returned to Sweden and Örgryte, his third spell at the club.

On 14 December 2009, after Örgryte IS was relegated from Allsvenskan, Allbäck announced his retirement from football.

After Sweden's victory against the Netherlands, it was official that Allbäck would participate in Örgryte's next home game against Motala, He came on in the 69th minute but could not affect the game.

International career
Allbäck made his debut for the national side on 27 November 1999 in a friendly against South Africa.
He was selected for Sweden's Euro 2000 squad, but was the only outfield player who did not play for Sweden in the tournament. By the 2002 FIFA World Cup, Allbäck had established himself in the starting line-up after an impressive display in the qualification. However, he had a disappointing tournament with no goals. At Euro 2004, the 2006 World Cup, and Euro 2008, Allbäck was mostly used as a substitute. 

On 20 June 2006, during the 2006 World Cup, Allbäck helped Sweden earn a 2–2 draw against England by netting their first goal. This goal by Allbäck was the 2000th goal scored in the history of the World Cup. On 6 September, he scored twice to help propel Sweden past visitors Liechtenstein 3–1 in the second of their 2008 European Championship qualifying matches.

On 6 June 2007, during Euro 2008 qualifiers, Allbäck scored a highly surreal goal against Iceland when an opponent, Ívar Ingimarsson, gave him the ball incorrectly thinking a free kick had been awarded.

After Sweden's group stage exit from Euro 2008 (in which he played as a second-half substitute against Russia in Innsbruck), Allbäck announced that he would retire from the national team, ending his international career with 74 caps with 30 goals. . 

Allbäck worked for SVT as a commentator during the FIFA Confederations Cup 2009 in South Africa.

Post-playing career

On 7 November 2009, Allbäck was named as the new assistant coach of the Sweden national football team. He stepped down from this position in 2016, following Sweden's disappointing Euro 2016 campaign. He started his career as a football agent later the same year.

Career statistics

Club

International 

Scores and results list Sweden's goal tally first, score column indicates score after each Allbäck goal.

Honours
F.C. Copenhagen
 Danish Superliga: 2005–06, 2006–07

Örgryte IS
 Svenska Cupen: 2000

Individual
 Stor Grabb: 2002

References

External links
 National team profile 

1973 births
Living people
Footballers from Gothenburg
Swedish footballers
Association football forwards
Örgryte IS players
Lyngby Boldklub players
S.S.C. Bari players
SC Heerenveen players
Aston Villa F.C. players
FC Hansa Rostock players
F.C. Copenhagen players
Allsvenskan players
Superettan players
Ettan Fotboll players
Danish Superliga players
Serie A players
Eredivisie players
Premier League players
Bundesliga players
Sweden international footballers
2002 FIFA World Cup players
2006 FIFA World Cup players
UEFA Euro 2000 players
UEFA Euro 2004 players
UEFA Euro 2008 players
Swedish expatriate footballers
Expatriate men's footballers in Denmark
Swedish expatriate sportspeople in Denmark
Expatriate footballers in Italy
Swedish expatriate sportspeople in Italy
Expatriate footballers in the Netherlands
Swedish expatriate sportspeople in the Netherlands
Expatriate footballers in England
Swedish expatriate sportspeople in England
Expatriate footballers in Germany
Swedish expatriate sportspeople in Germany